E92 may refer to:
 European route E92
 King's Indian Defense, Encyclopaedia of Chess Openings code
 Daini Hanna Road, route E92 in Japan

See also 
 BMW 3 Series (E90)